Klezmer (from  כלי זמר, lit. "vessels of song", meaning "musical instruments" in Hebrew; in Yiddish, "klezmer" refers to a professional Jewish instrumentalist) is a music with origins in Eastern Europe. It was originally played by the Jews, but now, since a revival starting in the 1970s, it has become popular in America, among bands who have brought it back to Europe.

Modern Klezmer bands

Austin Klezmorim
Bester Quartet
Beyond the Pale
Brave Old World
Budowitz
The Cracow Klezmer Band
Daniel Kahn & the Painted Bird
Di Naye Kapelye
Dobranotch
Ensemble DRAj
Flying Bulgar Klezmer Band
Giora Feidman
Golem
The Kabalas
Kharkov Klezmer Band
The Klezmatics
Klezmer Conservatory Band
Klezmofobia
The Klezmorim
Kleztory
Kolsimcha - The World Quintet
Kroke
Kruzenshtern & Parohod
Mames Babegenush
Maxwell Street Klezmer Band
Metropolitan Klezmer
Moishe's Bagel
New Klezmer Quintet
Veretski Pass
Yale Strom & Hot Pstromi

Older Klezmer bands
Belf's Romanian Orchestra
Dave Tarras
Naftule Brandwein
Abe Schwartz
Harry Kandel

References

 
Klezmer